Mumej (also Romanized as Mūmej, Mowmej, Mūmaj, and Mūmech) is a village in Abarshiveh Rural District, in the Central District of Damavand County, Tehran Province, Iran. At the 2006 census, its population was 242, in 80 families.

References 

Populated places in Damavand County